Phaea maryannae is a species of beetle in the family Cerambycidae. It was described by Chemsak in 1977. It is known from Mexico.

References

maryannae
Beetles described in 1977